The Community of the Gospel is a non-residential monastic community formed under the Canons of the Episcopal Church in the United States of America in the worldwide Anglican Communion, whose members apply basic monastic principles grounded in the Gospels to everyday living through devotion to prayer, study, and service.

The organization is recognized as a Christian community in the Episcopal Church by the House of Bishops' Committee on Religious Communities.  The Community of the Gospel is a full member of the National Association of Episcopal Religious Communities (NAECC).  The community is listed in recent editions of Anglican Religious Life:  A Year Book of Religious Orders and Communities in the Anglican Communion.

The community is composed of women and men over the age of 21, single or partnered, who are baptized members of a Christian denomination and claim the Gospels as the basis for their spirituality.  Before becoming full members, individuals move through classic stages of monastic discernment as discerners, postulants, novices, and professed.

Members live and work in various parts of the United States and the Commonwealth of the Bahamas. They meet for a  convocation annually. Full members of the community may take a religious name; use the title “Brother” or “Sister”;  have voting rights on issues affecting the general welfare of the community; and wear a designated monastic habit.   In addition to a constitution, by-laws, and customary that articulate the organizational understandings and definitions of the community, all members are bound by  A Common Rule for Monastics of the Community of the Gospel, a publication authored by the community's founder.

The Community of the Gospel was founded in March 2007 by Br. Daniel-Joseph Schroeder, the community's first Guardian (superior). Guardians serve a term of four years and are elected by the professed members of the community. The Rt. Rev. Megan Traquair, Bishop of the Diocese of Northern California,  is the Bishop Visitor.

External links 
 Community of the Gospel Official Website

Anglican orders and communities
Christian organizations established in 2007
Anglican religious orders established in the 21st century